Loga is a town and an urban commune in Niger.

Loga is the capital of the Loga Department located in the Dosso Region.

The exercise Loga, a combination of the exercise of yoga and Lim which was founded in 1978 and was named after this city, after the city appeared in a dream.

References 

Communes of Niger
Dosso Region